Lepidochrysops haveni is a butterfly in the family Lycaenidae. It is found in Yemen. The habitat consists of arid stony ground at altitudes of about 900 meters.

Adults have been recorded in October and May.

Etymology
The species is named for Frederik Christian von Haven, the philologist member of the Danish expedition to Arabia Felix (Yemen) in the middle of the eighteenth century.

References

Butterflies described in 1983
Lepidochrysops
Endemic fauna of Yemen